Jürgen Gmehling (born January 13, 1946 in Duisburg) is a retired German professor of technical and industrial chemistry at the Carl von Ossietzky University of Oldenburg.

Biography
His career started with an apprenticeship as a laboratory assistant at the Duisburg copper works  before he studied chemical engineering at the engineering school in Essen and then chemistry in Dortmund and Clausthal. He received his diploma from the University of Dortmund in 1970 and his PhD (Dr. rer. nat., inorganic chemistry) in 1973. After this he worked as a scientific coworker in Dortmund before he became a private lecturer and, after his habilitation, an assistant professor.

Gmehling was appointed a full professor for technical chemistry at the University of Oldenburg in 1989 and retired in 2011.

Fields of research
Gmehling's main focus is the process development. This includes the development of software for process synthesis and process simulation as well as measurement, collection, and estimation of thermophysical properties of pure components and component mixtures. The following list summarizes fields of his scientific work but is in no way complete.

Measurements
 Phase equilibrium data (vapor-liquid equilibria, liquid-liquid equilibria, solid–liquid equilibria, gas solubilities, heats of mixing, activity coefficients and more)

Data collection
Gmehling began in the 1970s with the systematic evaluation of the scientific literature, aiming to build a data bank for vapor-liquid equilibria. These data were needed for the development of a new method for the prediction of activity coefficients named UNIFAC. This data bank is still named the Dortmund Data Bank.

Development of estimation and correlation models
Gmehling developed with colleagues models for the estimation of several thermodynamic and thermophysical properties:
 Activity coefficient models like UNIFAC (see also group contribution method) and extensions. For the further development of these widely used methods Gmehling founded an industry consortium where many international companies are participating.
 Equations of state (EOS) including mixing rules for applying EOS to mixtures (see PSRK).

Software development
The following implementation of his methods are also developments:
 an expert system for the entrainer selection for the azeotropic and extractive distillation

Awards 

Gmehling has received some awards:
 Arnold-Eucken Price in 1982 
 The Rosini Lectureship Award in 2008 
 The Gmelin-Beilstein-Denkmünze (Silver Medal) in 2010
 The Emil Kirschbaum Medal in 2013

Publications
Gmehling has published scientific articles and  books.

Selection of scientific articles

External links
 Chair at the University of Oldenburg
 Prof. Jürgen Gmehling
 DDBST GmbH
 LTP GmbH
 UNIFAC consortium
 Chemistry International article about Rossini Lectureship Award (accessed 2008-08-31)

1946 births
Living people
21st-century German chemists
People from Duisburg
Technical University of Dortmund alumni
Academic staff of the University of Oldenburg
Thermodynamicists
20th-century German chemists